= GPDF =

GPDF is an acronym for:

- Gambela People’s Democratic Front, a former political party in Ethiopia (1998–2003).
- Gurage People’s Democratic Front, a political party in Ethiopia
- PDF viewer for GNOME
- Generalized probability density function
- Grand Prix de France (figure skating)
